Arnold Mampori (born 6 December 1991) is a Motswana footballer playing for Township Rollers in the Botswana Premier League and the Botswana national football team.

References

1991 births
Living people
Botswana footballers
Botswana international footballers
Association football midfielders
Township Rollers F.C. players